The Solids are a power pop band from Middletown, Connecticut. The band consists of Carter Bays (vocals, guitar), Craig Thomas (drums), Patrick Butler (keyboards), Doug Derryberry (lead guitar) and Josh Suniewick (bass). They have been writing, recording, and performing music since 1996.  The Solids first became popular for their song "The Future Is Now," which was the theme song for the Fox television program Oliver Beene.  A 12-second clip from their song "Hey, Beautiful" is the theme song for another show, the CBS sitcom How I Met Your Mother which was created by band members Bays and Thomas.

The band was formed in the summer of 1996 by Bays and Thomas.  They were joined by Patrick Butler and Nick Coleman and played their first show September 28, 1996, at the Alpha Delta Phi chapter house located at 185 High Street, in Middletown, Connecticut, on the campus of Wesleyan University, where they all studied.

Following the exposure Oliver Beene granted the band, the official website of The Solids became somewhat popular among alternative music fans. Along with "The Future Is Now", various mp3 files were offered for free, including demos and live performances.

Their song "Clowns Like Candy" was featured on an episode of NBC's Ed. It was also charted as #10 in "Top Alternative Internet Downloads" for issue #825 of Rolling Stone magazine, as well as an "Editor's Pick" for Rolling Stone Online.

The band released its self-titled album on January 24, 2008. They reside and perform in Los Angeles.

One of their songs is on How I Met Your Music (Deluxe).

References

External links
 Official website

American power pop groups
Rock music groups from Connecticut
Musical groups established in 1996
Musical quartets
Wesleyan University alumni